Zalkod is a village in Borsod-Abaúj-Zemplén county, Hungary.
In the 19th century, a small Jewish community lived in the village, many of whose members were murdered in the Holocaust
There was a Jewish cemetery in the village

References

External links 
 Street map 

Populated places in Borsod-Abaúj-Zemplén County
Jewish communities destroyed in the Holocaust